Frank A. Liberati (born February 7, 1964) is a Democratic politician from Michigan who formerly represented the 13th District – which comprised the cities of Allen Park and Southgate, and part of Dearborn Heights – in the Michigan House of Representatives after being elected in November 2014.

He is a candidate for the newly-drawn Michigan 1st Senate district race in 2022.

Early life and education 
Liberati was born in Allen Park, Michigan. At the age of 16, Liberati joined the United Food and Commercial Workers Union and began working at a Farmer Jack supermarket. After graduating from Allen Park High School, Liberati attended Michigan State University. Liberati spent time as a marketing manager, before opening up Liberati's Italian Deli in Allen Park.

Political career 
Liberati began his political career in 2004 when he joined the Allen Park school board, and was its president from 2006-2012.

In 2014, Liberati ran for Michigan 13th House district. Liberati defeated Republican challenger Harry Sawicki with 61% of the vote. Liberati would defeat Annie Spencer in 2016 and 2018 with 60.76% and 62.75% of the vote.

Electoral history

References

External links
 

1964 births
Living people
Democratic Party members of the Michigan House of Representatives
Politicians from Detroit
Michigan State University alumni
21st-century American politicians
People from Allen Park, Michigan